Juan Rubio (born 31 July 1951) is a Spanish water polo player. He competed at the 1968 Summer Olympics and the 1972 Summer Olympics.

References

1951 births
Living people
Spanish male water polo players
Olympic water polo players of Spain
Water polo players at the 1968 Summer Olympics
Water polo players at the 1972 Summer Olympics
Water polo players from Barcelona
20th-century Spanish people